Lontalius is a monotypic butterfly genus in the family Lycaenidae. Its single species, Lontalius eltus, is found in Borneo and the Philippines. Both the genus and species were first described by John Nevill Eliot in 1986.

References

External links
 With images

Miletinae
Taxa named by John Nevill Eliot
Lycaenidae genera
Monotypic butterfly genera